Micropholis rugosa is a species of plant in the family Sapotaceae. It is endemic to Jamaica.

References

rugosa
Near threatened plants
Endemic flora of Jamaica
Taxonomy articles created by Polbot